General elections were held in Anguilla on 28 May 1980. The result was a victory for the Anguilla United Movement, which won six of the seven seats in the House of Assembly.

Results
Connell Harrigan and Euton Smith were appointed as the nominated members.

References

Elections in Anguilla
Anguilla
General
Anguilla
Anguilla
Election and referendum articles with incomplete results